Horní Bukovina is a municipality and village in Mladá Boleslav District in the Central Bohemian Region of the Czech Republic. It has about 200 inhabitants.

Administrative parts
The village of Dolní Bukovina is an administrative part of Horní Bukovina.

References

Villages in Mladá Boleslav District